Grainola is a town in northwest Osage County, Oklahoma, United States. The population was 31 at the 2010 census, a figure which was unchanged from 2000. The main industry of the area is cattle ranching. The town name was invented in March 1910.

History
Grainola was originally named Salt Creek for a nearby tributary of the Arkansas River. The Salt Creek post office opened in November 1906, and the townsite was officially organized in 1909. The name was changed to Grainola in March 1910. The town supported nearby farmers and cattle ranchers, but has experienced a prolonged decline since 1920, when it had an estimated population of 500.

Geography
Grainola is located at  (36.938394, -96.650517).

Demographics

As of the census of 2000, there were 31 people, 15 households, and 10 families residing in the town. There were 22 housing units at an average density of 92.4 per square mile (35.4/km2). The racial makeup of the town was 61.29% White, 32.26% Native American, and 6.45% from two or more races.

There were 15 households, out of which 26.7% had children under the age of 18 living with them, 40.0% were married couples living together, 33.3% had a female householder with no husband present, and 26.7% were non-families. 26.7% of all households were made up of individuals, and 13.3% had someone living alone who was 65 years of age or older. The average household size was 2.07 and the average family size was 2.36.

In the town, the population was spread out, with 19.4% under the age of 18, 12.9% from 18 to 24, 16.1% from 25 to 44, 22.6% from 45 to 64, and 29.0% who were 65 years of age or older. The median age was 48 years. For every 100 females, there were 106.7 males. For every 100 females age 18 and over, there were 92.3 males.

The median income for a household in the town was $33,750, and the median income for a family was $33,750. Males had a median income of $43,750 versus $10,833 for females. The per capita income for the town was $18,065. There were 25.0% of families and 22.6% of the population living below the poverty line, including 50.0% of under eighteens and 28.6% of those over 64.

References

External links
 Encyclopedia of Oklahoma History and Culture - Grainola

Towns in Osage County, Oklahoma
Towns in Oklahoma
Populated places established in 1909